Kings of Kashmir:
 ancient, Rajatarangini
 modern, Dogra dynasty, the Royal House of Jammu and Kashmir